The Mbaracayú Forest Nature Reserve is a protected area in Paraguay.

Location

The Mbaracayú Forest Nature Reserve protects an area of high, humid subtropical forest in the upper Jejuí River basin.
It hold one of the last large, well-preserved remnants of Alto Paraná Atlantic forests in Paraguay.
The reserve would be part of the proposed Trinational Biodiversity Corridor, which aims to provide forest connections between conservation units in Brazil, Paraguay and Argentina in the Upper Paraná ecoregion.

History

The Mbaracayú Forest Nature Reserve was established by an agreement between the government of Paraguay, the Moisés Bertoni Foundation, the United Nations and The Nature Conservancy, later ratified in 1991 by national law 112/91. The reserve was declared a Paraguay heritage area dedicated in perpetuity to protect the forest, biological diversity and cultural resources, and to promote sustainable development.
The reserve was submitted on 19 December 2003 as a proposed World Heritage Site.

Environment

The Mbaracayú Forest Nature Reserve  in an area of cattle ranches and small farms.
The Mbaracaya Range crosses the north eastern corner of the reserve.
There are many small, deep valleys with waterfalls and streams that feed the Jejui River.
Soils are mainly sandy and infertile.

88% of the vegetation consists of different types of forest. 
The rest is wetland, pasture, lagoon, river or cerrado.
Riparian forests border the Jejui-mi and are subject to periodic flooding.
Commercially useful plants include Yerba mate (Ilex paraguariensis), Alsophila atrovirens, Anthurium plowmanii, Aspidosperma polyneuron and Phyrus species.
Other plants include Tabebuia species, Cedrela fissilis, Balfourodendron riedelianum, Cordia tricótoma, Piptadenia species and  Peltophorum dubium.

Fauna include jaguar (Panthera onca), South American tapir (Tapirus terrestris), maned wolf (Chrysocyon brachyurus), bush dog (Speothos venaticus) and other threatened or endangered species, neotropical otter (Lontra longicaudis) and giant armadillo (Priodontes maximus).
The wetlands harbor yacare caiman (Caiman yacare) and broad-snouted caiman (Caiman latirostris).
There are about 20 species of  amphibians.
There are over 400 species of birds including red-and-green macaw (Ara chloropterus), king vulture (Sarcoramphus papa), black-fronted piping guan (Pipile jacutinga), helmeted woodpecker (Celeus galeatus) and bare-throated bellbird (Procnias nudicollis'').
There is great diversity of butterflies and at least 219 species of ants.

Notes

Sources

Protected areas of Paraguay
1991 establishments in Paraguay
Protected areas of the Atlantic Forest